The Clinton Public Library is the local branch of the Huron County Library, located in Clinton, Ontario.

History 
The original library building was designed by local architect Joseph Ades Fowler; the design was accepted by committee "after careful consideration" in September 1897. It was originally known as Stavely Hall. "Constructed of pressed red brick and with an open entrance vestibule, Stavely Hall, when it opened in 1900, was considered the area’s best-appointed library and reading room."  
The first part of the town library was built in 1900. It is located in Library Park in Clinton, which is framed by the town hall to the south, the library to the east and commercial blocks to the west and north. The library building is of similar size and height as the town hall.

Built with money from James Stavely, a local settler, the two-storey red-brick building has a three-storey conical tower on the north-east side. The fenestration around the structure varies in shape and size; it features a bold roofline accentuated by brick banding and voussoirs. The second smaller part of the library was built with a Carnegie Foundation grant. The grant of $4,900 was received on January 6, 1915. J. Ades Fowler was the architect for the addition. The Clinton library was the only Ontario library to have an addition funded by the Carnegie Foundation.

The addition is located on the south side of the building and features a circular corner reading room, similar to the north part of the structure. "The building is a worthy example of turn of the century building, both functional and inspired in its design". The building is protected under Part IV of the Ontario Heritage Act, since 1978.

The new annex

A period newspaper described the opening of the new annex:
"The new Carnegie Annex of the Clinton Public Library is now being fully appreciated by the multitudes of local readers, as the splendid large stack room with its twelve hundred square feet and nearly eight thousand volumes was last week thrown open to the public. The five thousand dollar grant which was secured from Mr. Carnegie through the medium of the Clinton Board of Trade has been spent in the erection of a roomy annex, and the Library Board decided that as far as possible they would re -organize the Library throughout and adopt the most modern methods in an effort to make the Library "up-to- date," in every way. The Dewey Decimal System of cataloging and indexing has been used, also the Newark System of changing, both of which are considered the best available.

A department not generally emphasized in small libraries is the Children's Department, but in the Clinton Library special attention has been given to this and twelve hundred volumes of books specially suitable for children have been placed in a large bright room at the disposal of the children. The interior of the old Library has been re - papered, painted and furnished in harmony with the new part and a splendid new systems of lighting introduced, also a drinking fountain and lavatory has been installed. While the circulation of this library has averaged for a number of years eighteen thousand volumes, and in 1915 went as high as nineteen thousand, and which is about twice the circulation at most libraries in Ontario of this size, it is expected that because of the increased accommodation the circulation will be still further increased. Visitors and others interested in libraries claim that the Clinton library is one of the most up- to- date in the Province, and is not excelled by any town of its size. Much of the credit for the success of this institution must be given to the indefatigable President, Mr. W. Brydone, who has given an immense amount of time and thought in the creating of the library and in the completion of the new building, as well as the librarian, Miss M, Rudd, who has been most thorough In her work of rearranging the several thousand volumes."

See also 
Ontario Public Libraries
List of Carnegie libraries in Canada

References 

Carnegie libraries in Canada
Public libraries in Ontario
1900 establishments in Ontario
Designated heritage properties in Ontario
Libraries established in 1900